Cherie Nowlan (born Singleton, New South Wales, Australia) is an Australian film and television director, best known for the 2007 film Clubland (a.k.a. Introducing the Dwights) and the 1997 film Thank God He Met Lizzie, starring Cate Blanchett and Frances O'Connor, her feature film directorial debut.

Career
Nowlan grew up in the country town of Singleton, Australia, and after working briefly as a journalist began a career in film and television. She worked as a production assistant, researcher and writer for various independent production companies, including Kennedy Miller, as well as in commercial television.

Nowlan's first film was a documentary entitled God's Girls (1991), about the nuns who taught in her former high school. The film won the Best Documentary prize at the Australian Film Institute Awards. The ABC/BBC co-production was described by The Guardian in the UK as 'much more gripping than the fictional Brides of Christ '. It was nominated for an Australian Film Institute Award and was a finalist in the Sydney Film Festival's Dendy Short Film Competition.

Nowlan studied scriptwriting at the Australian Film Television and Radio School in 1993.

Clubland, which starred Oscar nominee Brenda Blethyn and rising star Emma Booth, sold to Warner Independent Pictures for $4.1 million, after debuting at Sundance Film Festival. The film generated standing ovations at Sundance, and was nominated for eleven AFI awards, including Best Director and Best Actress.

In 1995, she wrote and directed the short film Lucinda 31, which was screened in film festivals in New York City and Brisbane, where it was voted Most Popular Film at the 1995 Brisbane Exposure Festival. The script was an adaptation of a short story by Alexandra Long.

She has also had a career in television, directing episodes of The Secret Life of Us, All Saints, Dance Academy, Packed to the Rafters and the American series Life Unexpected and 90210. As well as the television films Marking Time (2003), Small Claims (2004), The Alice (2005), Small Claims: White Wedding (2007), Underbelly Files: The Man Who Got Away (2011) and Underbelly: Razor (2011).

Filmography

Film

Television

References

External links

Interview with Cherie Nowlan at UrbanCineFile.com

Australian film directors
Australian television directors
Australian women film directors
Living people
People from New South Wales
Australian women television directors
Year of birth missing (living people)